WPIK (102.5 FM) is a radio station licensed to Summerland Key, Florida, United States. The station serves the Florida Keys area. The station is currently owned by Magnum Broadcasting, Inc.

On September 29, 2020, WPIK returned to the air with conservative talk, branded as "Keys Talk 96.9/102.5", simulcasting WKEZ-FM 96.9 Tavernier.

Previous logo

References

External links

PIK
Talk radio stations in the United States